Arif Shaikh (born 11 November 1993) is an Indian professional footballer who last played as a striker for Gokulam Kerala FC  in the I-League.

Career
Born in Mumbai, Maharashtra, Shaikh played in the Pune F.C. Academy during the I-League U19. After spending time with Pune, Shaikh signed with DSK Shivajians. He made his professional debut for the club on the final match day of the I-League season on 24 April 2016 against Mumbai. He came on as a 69th-minute substitute for Sampath Kuttimani as DSK Shivajians lost 4–0.

Career statistics

References

External links 
 DSK Shivajians Profile.

1993 births
Living people
Footballers from Mumbai
Indian footballers
Pune FC players
DSK Shivajians FC players
Association football forwards
I-League players